Lower Allithwaite is a civil parish in the South Lakeland District of Cumbria, England. It contains 98 listed buildings that are recorded in the National Heritage List for England. Of these, one is listed at Grade I, the highest of the three grades, three are at Grade II*, the middle grade, and the others are at Grade II, the lowest grade.  The parish includes the villages of Cartmel, which contains most of the listed buildings in the parish, and Allithwaite, and the surrounding countryside.  Most of the listed buildings are houses and associated structures, shops, public houses and hotels, farmhouses, and farm buildings.  The other listed buildings include churches and items in the churchyard, crosses, a tower house, the gatehouse to a former priory, limekilns, bridges, guide stones, a lamppost, a school, a Quaker meeting house, a war memorial, and a village lock-up.


Key

Buildings

References

Citations

Sources

Lists of listed buildings in Cumbria